Mastermind is the eighth studio album by American rock band Monster Magnet. A video for the first single, "Gods and Punks", was released on October 1, 2010. The album was released on October 25, 2010.
It debuted at No. 165 on the Billboard 200 selling around 3,000 copies, becoming the band's first album since 2001's God Says No to chart on the Billboard 200. Mastermind was the final album of lead guitarist and long-term member Ed Mundell, as well as bassist Jim Baglino. This album marked the return of guitarist Phil Caivano after his 4-year hiatus.

Track listing 
All tracks written by Dave Wyndorf except where stated.
 "Hallucination Bomb" – 5:27
 "Bored with Sorcery" – 4:02
 "Dig That Hole" (Wyndorf, Phil Caivano) – 5:34
 "Gods and Punks" – 5:32
 "The Titan Who Cried Like a Baby" – 3:36
 "Mastermind" – 5:08
 "100 Million Miles" – 5:01
 "Perish in Fire" – 4:42
 "Time Machine" – 5:30
 "When the Planes Fall from the Sky" – 5:46
 "Ghost Story" – 5:20
 "All Outta Nothin'" – 4:29
 "Watch Me Fade" (bonus track) – 3:05
 "Fuzz Pig" (bonus track) – 3:13

Personnel
Dave Wyndorf - guitar, vocals
Philip Caivano - guitar
Ed Mundell - guitar
Bob Pantella -	drums
Jim Baglino - bass

Production and art
Matt Hyde - producer, engineer
Dave Wyndorf - producer, art direction
Philip Caivano - engineer, additional production
Chris Rakestraw - engineer
Tom Baker - mastering
Ryan Clark - illustrations

Charts

References 

Monster Magnet albums
2010 albums
Napalm Records albums